Tres Fronteras is the Spanish name for an area of the Amazon Rainforest in the Upper Amazon region of South America. It includes, and is named for, the tripoint where the borders of Brazil, Peru, and Colombia meet. The upper Amazon River flows through the area.

Geography
The area is noted for its natural beauty. Cities in the Tres Fronteras area include Tabatinga (in Brazil), Leticia (in Colombia), and Santa Rosa de Yavari (in Peru) on an island in the Amazon River.

See also
Amazon basin

References

External links
Human mobility in the triple border of Peru, Colombia and Brazil, Márcia Maria de Oliveira, São Paulo May/August 2006 (abstract in English, text in Portuguese).

 
Border tripoints
Brazil–Colombia border
Brazil–Peru border
Colombia–Peru border
Geography of Amazonas (Brazilian state)
Geography of Loreto Region
Regions of Brazil
Regions of Colombia
Regions of Peru
Upper Amazon
 Regions of South America